West Stockholm is a hamlet in St. Lawrence County, New York, United States. West Stockholm has a post office with ZIP code 13696, which opened on March 25, 1825.

References

Hamlets in St. Lawrence County, New York
Hamlets in New York (state)